The 1906–07 Wisconsin Badgers men's basketball team represented University of Wisconsin–Madison. The head coach was Emmett Angell, coaching his third season with the Badgers. The team played their home games at the Red Gym in Madison, Wisconsin and was a member of the Western Conference.

Schedule

References

Wisconsin Badgers men's basketball seasons
Wisconsin
Wisconsin Badger
Wisconsin Badger